Astropyga pulvinata is a species of sea urchins of the family Diadematidae. Their armour is covered with spines. Astropyga pulvinata was first scientifically described in 1816 by Jean-Baptiste de Lamarck.

References

Animals described in 1816
Diadematidae
Taxa named by Jean-Baptiste Lamarck